The Tanimbar flycatcher (Ficedula riedeli) is a species of bird in the family Muscicapidae.  It is found on the Tanimbar Islands.  Its habitats are subtropical or tropical moist lowland forests and subtropical or tropical moist montane forests.  It is threatened by habitat loss.

It is sometimes considered a subspecies of the rufous-chested flycatcher.

References

Ficedula
Birds described in 1886
Taxa named by Johann Büttikofer